Sun Yu is the name of:

Sun Yu (Han dynasty) (177–215), cousin of the warlord Sun Quan during the late Han Dynasty
Sun Yu (director) (1900–1990), Chinese film director
Sun Yu (badminton) (born 1994), Chinese badminton player

See also
Sun Yue (disambiguation)